Kirill Nikolaevich Pasichnik (born 24 May 1994) is a Kazakh footballer who plays as a centre-back.

Career

In 2017, Pasichnik played for Buxoro in Uzbekistan.

References

External links

Living people
1994 births
Kazakhstani footballers
Association football central defenders
Kazakhstan under-21 international footballers
Kazakhstan Premier League players
 Uzbekistan Super League players
FC Astana players
FC Aktobe players
FC Shakhter Karagandy players
FC Zhetysu players
FC Taraz players